Corlett is a surname of Manx origin. The name is an Anglicisation of the Gaelic Mac Thorliot, derived from an Old Norse personal name composed of two elements: the name Þórr and ljótr meaning "bright". Another opinion is that the Old Norse Þorliótr may mean "Thor-people". The name appears earliest in records as Corlett in 1504 and MacCorleot in 1511.

People

Andrew Corlett, Deputy Deemster of the Isle of Man
Charles H. Corlett (1889–1971), major general in the U.S. Army
Claire Corlett (born 1999), daughter of Ian James Corlett; Canadian actress
E. C. B. Corlett, British author, naval architect and consultant
George Milton Corlett, 25th Lieutenant Governor of Colorado
Ian James Corlett (born 1962), Canadian animation voice artist, writer, and musician
Capt. John Corlett (1751–1814), settled in Philadelphia; grandfather of Sir Mark Collet, 1st Baronet 
John Corlett (born 1950), Her Majesty's Attorney General for the Isle of Man and ex officio Member of the Legislative Council
Marama Corlett, Maltese actor and dancer
Samuel Corlett (1852–1921), English cricketer
Simon Corlett (born 1950), cricketer
William Corlett (1938–2005), English children's writer
William Wellington Corlett (1842–1890), Delegate from the Territory of Wyoming

References

Surnames of Manx origin
Manx-language surnames